Alexandra Lilah Denton (also known as Aleksandra Lilah Yakunina-Denton, born 17 June 1991), known professionally as Shura, is an English singer, songwriter and record producer. She is known for her work in the genres of electropop and synth-pop.

Career

2011–2016: Nothing's Real
During night shifts at her workplace (a video editing facility), she watched YouTube tutorial videos on how to use music production software. Her single "Touch", co-produced with Joel Pott of Athlete, drew positive notice from internet blogs during early 2014; its music video was co-directed and edited by Shura herself. Two other singles, "Just Once" and "Indecision", followed the same year, and Shura produced a remix of Jessie Ware's single "Say You Love Me". Shura was longlisted in the BBC Sound of 2015 poll. Shura is also signed to Universal Music Publishing Group in the United Kingdom. She released the single "2Shy" in March 2015, followed by "White Light" and a performance film titled Three Years in June 2015. An EP titled White Light was released in the United States in July. The same year, Shura performed at music festivals including Bestival, Festival N°6, and Latitude.

In December 2014 she was named as one of the nominated acts on the longlist for the BBC music poll Sound of 2015. Mumford & Sons have covered her song "2Shy".

Shura's "Touch" was released on 18 February 2016 alongside a version featuring Talib Kweli. The Original Mix was released on Record Store Day 2016 as a limited 12" single featuring remixes from Canvas and Delorean.

Her debut album Nothing's Real was released on 8 July 2016 via Polydor Records.

2017–present: forevher
In 2018, she was reported working in the studio on new music with frequent collaborator Joel Pott, as well as Tourist and Totally Enormous Extinct Dinosaurs.

In 2019, she made a comeback after three years of silence, when she collaborated with British musician Tourist on the song "Love Theme", which was released on Valentine's Day through his second album Everyday. Tourist explained that the song was a concept originally written by Shura and had a piano demo that was sent to him by her with the lyrics "I don't want to be the centre of attention, but I want your love". The following month, Shura announced her comeback single, entitled "BKLYNLDN", alternatively titled "Brooklyn London". It was premiered by Phil Taggart on BBC Radio 1 on 10 March 2019 where it was revealed as the "Chillest Record".

Shura's album Forevher was released on 16 August 2019 via Secretly Canadian. Shura announced the album on 12 June 2019 with the release of single "Religion (U Can Lay Your Hands on Me)".

In a November 2019 interview with The Guardian, former Spice Girls member Melanie C revealed that she has been working on her eighth studio album with Shura.

On 16 March 2020, Shura released the single "elevator girl" featuring the Philadelphia rapper Ivy Sole. She released an alternate version titled "elevator girl (Space Tape Edit)" on 22 May 2020.

Personal life
Shura was born in Hammersmith, London, and grew up in Manchester. Her mother is a Russian actress and her father is an English documentary filmmaker. Her parents divorced when she was three. Shura has two brothers, including a twin, Nicholas, who has starred in three of her music videos: "Touch", "White Light" and "What's It Gonna Be?". She began playing the guitar when she was 13 years old and started recording music at 16. Shura had been a promising footballer in her youth and played for Manchester City from under 11 to under 16 level, despite being a Manchester United fan.

Shura is an out lesbian and an atheist, despite a long-standing fascination with religion. In summer 2014 she experienced a severe panic attack, which she described as "feel[ing] like I [was] dying." Her stage name comes from a short form of her first name in Russian, a language Shura is fluent in.

Artistry
Shura's music has been described as "infectious but melancholy electropop" as well as "slow-burning synth-pop" but has said that pop music "didn't represent" her. The singer has said that "missed opportunity, regret, nostalgia" are some of the main themes in her work.

Awards and nominations
{| class=wikitable
|-
! Year !! Awards !! Work !! Category !! Result !! Ref. 
|-
| 2016
| Popjustice £20 Music Prize
| "What's It Gonna Be?" 
| Best British Pop Single
| 
| 
|-
| rowspan=3|2019
| Music Producers Guild Awards
| Herself
| Remixer of the Year
| 
|
|-
| UK Music Video Awards
| "Religion"
| Best Pop Video - Newcomer
| 
|
|-
| Best Art Vinyl
| Forevher
| Best Vinyl Art
| 
|

Music videos 
 "Touch" (2014) 
"Indecision" (2015) 
"2Shy" (2015) 
"White Light" (2015) 
 "White Light (Extended Video)" (2015) 
 "What's It Gonna Be?" (2016) 
"311215" (2016) 
"BKLYNLDN" (2019) 
"religion (u can lay your hands on me)" (2019) 
 "religion (u can lay your hands on me) (Vertical Video)" (2019) 
 "obsession" (2021)

Discography

Albums

Singles

Featured appearances
 Mura Masa – "Love for That" (2015) 
 Tracey Thorn – "Air" (2018)

Remixes

References

External links
 

1991 births
British women record producers
English atheists
English electronic musicians
English women pop singers
English women singer-songwriters
English people of Russian descent
English record producers
English women guitarists
English guitarists
English women in electronic music
Interscope Records artists
Lesbian singers
Lesbian songwriters
English lesbian musicians
English LGBT singers
English LGBT songwriters
Living people
Musicians from Manchester
People from Hammersmith
Polydor Records artists
Singers from London
Synth-pop singers
English twins
LGBT record producers
21st-century English women singers
21st-century British guitarists
20th-century LGBT people
21st-century LGBT people
21st-century women guitarists